Nik Omladič (born 21 August 1989) is a Slovenian professional footballer who plays as a midfielder for German  club Hallescher FC.

Club career
Omladič started his career at his hometown club Šmartno ob Paki. As a youngster, he moved to nearby Rudar Velenje. He made his Rudar debut on 29 October 2006 in the 2. SNL tie with Dravinja. Omladič began to establish himself in the Rudar first team during the 2006–07 season, making 15 appearances and scoring one goal. In the next season he was regular in the midfield, making 24 appearances and scoring three goals. Rudar was first in the 2. SNL and won promotion to the PrvaLiga. In his first season in Slovenian top division Omladič made 31 appearances and scored one goal.

On 29 January 2010, it was announced that he signed a contract with Olimpija Ljubljana.

On 9 January 2015, Omladič joined German club Eintracht Braunschweig, signing a two-and-a-half-year contract. At the end of the 2016–17 season, he chose not to extend his contract. On 6 June 2017, he signed for Greuther Fürth.

On 27 January 2023, Omladič signed a contract with 3. Liga club Hallescher FC until the end of the 2022–23 season.

International career
Omladič made his debut for the Slovenia national under-21 team on 19 August 2008 as a late substitute in a friendly match against England U21.

On 30 March 2015, he made his debut for the senior Slovenian national team, in a friendly against Qatar.

References

External links

 
 Player profile at NZS 

1989 births
Living people
Sportspeople from Celje
Association football midfielders
Slovenian footballers
Slovenia youth international footballers
Slovenia under-21 international footballers
Slovenia international footballers
Slovenian expatriate footballers
Expatriate footballers in Germany
Slovenian expatriate sportspeople in Germany
Slovenian Second League players
Slovenian PrvaLiga players
2. Bundesliga players
Regionalliga players
3. Liga players
NK Rudar Velenje players
NK Šmartno 1928 players
NK Olimpija Ljubljana (2005) players
Eintracht Braunschweig players
SpVgg Greuther Fürth players
FC Hansa Rostock players
Hallescher FC players